Jackson is an unincorporated community in Otter Creek Township, Ripley County, in the U.S. state of Indiana.

Geography

References

Unincorporated communities in Ripley County, Indiana
Unincorporated communities in Indiana